Zenon: The Zequel is a 2001 Disney Channel Original Movie directed by Manny Coto. It is the second installment of the Disney Channel's Zenon television film series, following the first installment, Zenon: Girl of the 21st Century (1999), and preceding Zenon: Z3 (2004). The film is also the first sequel to be produced under the Disney Channel Original Movie banner. The Disney Channel Original Series Lizzie McGuire premiered after the film's premiere. This is the only Zenon film where Raven-Symoné doesn't play Nebula. She is replaced by Shadia Simmons.

Plot
Zenon Kar is now 15, two years older, in the year 2051 and none the wiser about the dangers of meddling, but when she shows Nebula a new game and how to play it, she inadvertently empties out Commander Plank's office and is assigned work detail in the Alien Patrol lab. It is revealed that Greg broke up with Zenon. The space station is now under command of the military and General Hammond is assigned to command the station. Even worse, he assigns Zenon to look after his daughter who turns out to be her old nemesis, Margie, who's demanding and threatens to have her dad kick Zenon and her family off the space station if Zenon doesn't obey her.

Zenon then discovers that her space station is being decommissioned due to damage from the plot by Wyndum and Lutz and sneaks down to Earth to try and stop it after getting a message from aliens that seem to want to meet with Proto Zoa, but Margie sneaks down to Earth as well, making it look like Zenon forced her to come along.

With the help of Aunt Judy, the girls track down Proto Zoa, who has become a recluse due to a combination of writer's block and the feeling he has passed the apex of his career due to his space concert, and convince him to join them. With Margie, Aunt Judy, Nebula, Orion the Alien Patrol lab guy, Proto Zoa, and her mother, Zenon goes to meet with the aliens near the Moon. However, their ship runs out of fuel and they nearly crash to their deaths on the Moon, but the aliens show up and rescue them. After Zenon meets the aliens on the Moon, they turn out to be friendly and, communicating with Zenon telepathically, reveal that they have been lost in space for three years and need the ship's navigation charts to get home, thinking it impolite to just take them.

After getting the charts, they then tow the ship back to the space station, where General Hammond refuses to relent, correctly pointing out that the space station is too dangerous to live on due to the extensive damage from the sabotage. Margie stands up to him for once, but it isn't enough until the aliens return. They push the space station back into orbit and return the previously decommissioned sections as a thank-you gift for helping them. With the space station saved, Commander Plank and General Hammond agree to share command. Plank and Aunt Judy get married at a wedding at which Proto Zoa plays, dedicating his new song to Zenon for his having been revitalized by the whole experience. It's also realized that the aliens they're actually trying to communicate with Zenon, not Proto Zoa, and they're using the transmission of his old concert to do so. Margie convinces her father to let her stay and she and Zenon become friends while Zenon gets a possible love interest in Orion.

Cast
 Kirsten Storms as Zenon Kar
 Shadia Simmons as Nebula Wade
 Lauren Maltby as Margie Hammond
 Susan Brady as Astrid Kar
 Robert Curtis-Brown as Mark Kar
 Phillip Rhys as Proto Zoa
 Holly Fulger as Judy Cling-Plank
 Stuart Pankin as Commander Edward Plank
 John Getz as General Hammond
 Tom Wright as Orion
 Michael Saccente as Lieutenant Hart
 Rupert Simmonds as Polaris
 Nicko Vella as Corvus
Jennifer Rucker as Carla Wade
 Stephen Lovatt as Wills

See also

List of films featuring extraterrestrials
 List of films featuring space stations
 Zenon: Z3

References

External links
 

Zenon
2001 television films
2001 films
2001 comedy films
2001 science fiction films
2000s English-language films
2000s science fiction comedy films
2000s teen comedy films
American science fiction comedy films
American science fiction television films
American sequel films
American teen comedy films
American comedy television films
Disney Channel Original Movie films
Films directed by Manny Coto
Films set in 2051
Films shot in New Zealand
Moon in film
Television sequel films
2000s American films